The 1975 Carrier Weathermakers season was the maiden season of the franchise in the Philippine Basketball Association (PBA).

Colors 
Carrier Weathermakers   (dark)  (light)

First Conference standings

Summary 
On April 9, the Weathermakers faced the Noritake Porcelainmakers in the inaugural double-header of the PBA at the Araneta Coliseum with a sellout crowd of 18,000 watching, the Carrier Weathermakers lost the game with a score of 101–98. Gregorio "Joy" Dionisio scored the very first basket in PBA history.

The Weathermakers struggled throughout the First Conference hovering around a .500 record, they missed the playoffs entirely and finished as the 5th seed. In the Second Conference, they struggled even more and finished with a disappointing 6–15 record and missed the playoffs again.

Lim Eng Beng, Gregorio Dionisio, and Ramon Lucindo were all selected to participate in the PBA Ovaltine dream games.

Roster 

Sources:
 Edmon1974's Blog: 1975 Philippine Basketball Association (PBA) Team Rosters

See also 
 1975 PBA season

References 

Carrier Weathermakers